The Kennedy Road Stakes is a thoroughbred horse race run annually at Woodbine Racetrack in Toronto, Ontario, Canada. Run during the latter part of November, the Grade II sprint race is open to horses aged three and older.  Raced over a distance of 6 furlongs, it currently offers a purse of C$200,000. The race was originally run on a natural dirt surface, but since 2006 has been on a synthetic "all weather" surface (Polytrack from 2005 to 2015, Tapeta starting in 2016).

Inaugurated in 1989 as the Kennedy Road Handicap, it was named in honour of Kennedy Road, the 1973 Canadian Horse of the Year and a Canadian Horse Racing Hall of Fame inductee.

Records
Speed  record: 
 1:08.05 - Chris's Bad Boy (2003) (on natural dirt)

Most wins:
 2 - Pink Lloyd (2017, 2019)
 2 - Stacked Deck (2015, 2016)
 2 - Blitzer (1994, 1995)

Most wins by an owner:
 4 - Frank Stronach (1994, 1995, 1996, 1997)

Most wins by a jockey:
 6 - Todd Kabel (1994, 1995, 1996, 1997, 2001, 2006)

Most wins by a trainer:
 5 - Robert P. Tiller (1994, 2002, 2005, 2017, 2019)
 3 - Daniel J. Vella (1995, 1996, 1997)

Winners

See also
 List of Canadian flat horse races

References

 The Kennedy Road Stakes at Pedigree Query

Graded stakes races in Canada
Open sprint category horse races
Recurring sporting events established in 1989
Woodbine Racetrack
1989 establishments in Ontario